"Forever in Blue Jeans" is a song by Neil Diamond which he co-wrote with his guitarist Richard Bennett. The up-tempo track was released as a single by Columbia in February 1979, having featured on Diamond's album You Don't Bring Me Flowers which was released the previous year. Diamond said about the song: "the simple things are really the important things". It peaked at #20 on the Billboard Hot 100 chart and #2 on the Easy Listening chart in March 1979.

Cash Box called the song "a pleasant tribute to 'doing OK' without the glitter of wealth and fame" and said that it has "a restrained carnival mood and solid jaunty rhythmic underpinning" and that Diamond's vocals are "gruff" and "appealing."

According to Cotton Incorporated, "Neil Diamond might have been right when he named his 1979 #1 hit “Forever in Blue Jeans”: 81% of women are planning their next jeans purchase to be some shade of blue." The song has been used to promote the sale of blue jeans, most notably by Will Ferrell who impersonated Diamond for The Gap. Coincidentally Diamond himself did radio adverts for H.I.S. brand jeans in the 1960s.

Later in 1979, Tommy Overstreet recorded a country version of the song, on his I'll Never Let You Down album.

Charts

Certifications

References 

1978 songs
1979 singles
Neil Diamond songs
Songs written by Neil Diamond
Song recordings produced by Bob Gaudio